The Impey River is a river in the Mid West region of Western Australia which rises south of Mount Murchison and flows east-north-east until it merges with the Murchison River of which it is a tributary.

The first recorded sighting of the river was by surveyor Robert Austin during an expedition in 1857. In 1858 the river was named by explorer Francis Gregory after the prominent geologist, Sir Roderick Impey Murchison.

References

Rivers of the Mid West region